Johann Ernst Immanuel Walch (29 August 1725 – 1 December 1778) was a German theologian, linguist, and naturalist from Jena.

Life
The son of the theologian Johann Georg Walch, he studied Semitic languages at the University of Jena, and also natural science and mathematics.  In 1749 he published Einleitung in die Harmonie der Evangelien, and in 1750 was appointed professor extraordinarius of theology. Five years later he became professor ordinarius of logic and metaphysics; in 1759 he exchanged this for a professorship of rhetoric and poetry.

Amongst his theological works were Dissertationes in Acta Apostolorum (1756–1761);  (1772); and after his death appeared Observationes in Matthaeum ex Graecis inscriptionibus (1779). He also edited a periodical Der Naturforscher (1774–1778), and during the years 1749-1756 took an active part in editing the Zeitungen von gelehrten Sachen.

In the later part of his career Walch found interest in the natural sciences, particularly fossils and geology. One significant result was the beautifully illustrated, four-volume Die Naturgeschichte der Versteinerungen (“The Natural History of
Petrifactions”), released from 1768 to 1773, and also published in French and Dutch editions. A comprehensive chapter on trilobites in 1771
contains the first use of the word "trilobite" and predates other equally comprehensive treatments by 50 years.

Walch died in Jena. His brother Christian Wilhelm Franz Walch was also theologian.

References

Attribution

1725 births
1778 deaths
18th-century German Protestant theologians
People from Saxe-Eisenach
German entomologists
German naturalists
German male non-fiction writers